The 1998 European Individual Speedway Junior Championship was the first edition of the Championship.

Semi-finals
Semi-Final A:
May 17, 1998
 Piła
Semi-Final B:
May 17, 1998
 Prelog

Final
July 18, 1998
 Krško, Matije Gubca Stadium

References

1998
Euro I J